Vito Laloata (born 15 October 1996) is a Samoan footballer who plays as a defender for Lupe ole Soaga in the Samoa National League and the Samoa national football team.

Laloata is from Magiagi Tai in Apia. He has played for Lupe ole Soaga since the age of ten.

Laloata played for Lupe ole Soaga in the Samoa National League and OFC Champions League. In 2020 he was recruited by Papua New Guinea club Hekari United for the 2020 OFC Champions League. He was released by Hekari in May 2020 due to uncertainty caused by the Covid-19 pandemic.

In June 2019 he was named to the Samoa national football team for the 2019 Pacific Games.

International goals
Scores and results list Samoa's goal tally first.

References

External links
 

Living people
1996 births
People from Tuamasaga
Samoan footballers
Association football defenders
Sportspeople from Apia
Samoa international footballers
Samoa youth international footballers